The men's sanda 52 kg at the 2002 Asian Games in Busan, South Korea was held from 10 to 13 October at the Dongseo University Minseok Sports Center.

A total of 14 men from 14 different countries competed in this event, limited to fighters whose body weight was less than 52 kilograms.

Kang Yonggang from China won the gold medal after beating Marvin Sicomen of the Philippines in gold medal bout 2–0, The bronze medal was shared by Lee Hou-cheng from Chinese Taipei and Phoukhong Khamsounthone of Laos. Athletes from Myanmar, South Korea, Iran and Yemen shared the fifth place.

Schedule
All times are Korea Standard Time (UTC+09:00)

Results
Legend
KO — Won by knockout

References

2002 Asian Games Report, Page 789
Results

External links
Official website

Men's sanda 52 kg